Telejornal is the flagship television newscast produced by state-owned public broadcaster Rádio e Televisão de Portugal (RTP). It is the longest running program in the history of television in Portugal as it has been broadcast daily since 18 October 1959.

It aires every day at 20:00 WET/WEST and is simulcast live on RTP1, RTP Internacional, RTP África and RTP Play. The title translates as tele-journal and is one of the most viewed in the country. The term 'Telejornal' in Portugal has become synonymous with television news.

History
The predecessor to Telejornal, Jornal de Actualidades, started on 15 February 1957.

On 18 October 1959, Jornal de Actualidades was replaced by Telejornal with two editions, the main one at 20:30 with half an hour, and a late edition before sign-off, that rarely happened after 23:30. The first presenters were Mário Pires and Alberto Lopes, but the choice made by RTP was seen as flawed. The newscast suffered constant cuts from the censors, as well as technical problems

Starting 1 November 1961, the weather reports were now seen in-vision from meteorologists, this time after the main news, as opposed to the late news, like it was before. The most famous weatherman, Anthímio de Azevedo, didn't join RTP until 1964. 

On 2 March 2009, RTP launched the video-on-demand service "O Meu Telejornal" through its website. Now, viewers can make their own newscast along with the news reports they want to see in the website anytime.

On 14 January 2012, RTP decided to reduce the runtime of Telejornal to 45 minutes, in order to have a similar runtime and format of its European counterparts.

On 31 August 2014, Telejornal broadcast without permission almost 3 minutes of the Lisbon derby match whose rights were owned by Benfica TV.

In 2015, RTP decided to return to the format of hour-long program.

Title cards

References

External links 
 
 Videos of recent editions

1959 Portuguese television series debuts
1950s Portuguese television series
1960s Portuguese television series
1970s Portuguese television series
1980s Portuguese television series
1990s Portuguese television series
2000s Portuguese television series
2010s Portuguese television series
2020s Portuguese television series
Television news shows
Rádio e Televisão de Portugal original programming
Flagship evening news shows